Alfredo Virginio Cano (born August 30, 1982 in Posadas, Argentina) is an Argentine footballer who played for Club General Díaz of the Paraguayan Primera División

Teams
  Olimpo de Bahía Blanca 2003-2004
  Sportivo Eldorado de Misiones 2004
  San Luis 2005
  Guarani Antonio Franco 2006
  2 de Mayo 2007-2008
  Sol de América 2009-2010
  Sportivo Luqueño 2010
  Atlético Colegiales 2011-2012
  Club General Díaz 2012-2017

See also
 List of expatriate footballers in Paraguay
 Players and Records in Paraguayan Football

References
 Profile at BDFA 
 

1982 births
Living people
Argentine footballers
Argentine expatriate footballers
Sportivo Luqueño players
Atlético Colegiales players
Club Sol de América footballers
Olimpo footballers
San Luis F.C. players
2 de Mayo footballers
General Díaz footballers
Expatriate footballers in Mexico
Expatriate footballers in Paraguay
Association footballers not categorized by position
People from Posadas, Misiones
Sportspeople from Misiones Province